Dave Grusin and the NY-LA Dream Band is an album by American pianist Dave Grusin released in 1984, recorded for the GRP label. The album was recorded live in Tokyo, Japan, at Budokan. The album reached No. 4 on Billboard's Jazz chart.

Track listing
All selections written by Dave Grusin; except where noted
"Shuffle City" - 4:22
"Countdown" - 8:03
"Serengetti Walk" (Dave Grusin, Harvey Mason, Louis Johnson) - 6:18
"What Matters Most" - 3:20
"Number 8" - 4:30
"Three Days of the Condor" - 4:43
"Summer Sketches" - 14:19

Personnel
 Dave Grusin – fender rhodes, acoustic piano, oberheim ob-x, vocoder, percussion, conductor
 Don Grusin – yamaha cp70, clavinet, fender rhodes, oberheim ob-x
 Tiger Okoshi – trumpet, flugelhorn
 George Young – saxophone, flute
 Eric Gale – guitar
 Lee Ritenour – guitar
 Anthony Jackson – bass guitar
 Steve Gadd – drums
 Rubens Bassini – percussion
 Dave Grusin, Larry Rosen – producers
 Ted Jensen at Sterling Sound, NYC – mastering

Charts

References

External links
Dave Grusin and the NY-LA Dream Band at Discogs
Dave Grusin and the NY-LA Dream Band at AllMusic

1984 live albums
GRP Records live albums
Dave Grusin albums
Albums recorded at the Nippon Budokan